Anthony Cecil John Dawes (10 February 1928 – 21 January 2021) was an English character actor, who appeared in a number of roles in film, television and on stage during a career which spanned from 1951 to 2006.

Life and career
Dawes was born in Felixstowe, Suffolk in February 1928. He graduated from the Royal Academy of Dramatic Art (RADA) in 1951. His roles on television included The Avengers, Fawlty Towers, Z-Cars and The Kenny Everett Television Show. He also had some minor film roles, including Barry Lyndon (1975).

He died in Chelsea, London in January 2021 at the age of 92 following a short illness. He was survived by his wife, Lesley, and his daughter, Stephanie.

Selected filmography
Z-Cars (1968–1972) – various roles
Upstairs, Downstairs (1973) – Breeze
Follow That Dog (1974) – Insp. Bridges
Barry Lyndon (1975) – British soldier
My Brother's Keeper (1975–1976) – Mr. Chivers
The Dick Emery Show (1975–1981) – various roles
Grange Hill (1979) – Mr. Golightly
Fawlty Towers (1979) – Mr. Libson
The Two Ronnies (1980)
Yes Minister (1981) – Committee Chairman
BBC2 Playhouse (1981–1982) – various roles
Minder (1982) – Mr. Notting QC
The Kenny Everett Television Show (1983) – various roles
Who, Sir? Me, Sir? (1985) – Headmaster
Keeping Up Appearances (1991) – The Jeweller
Hollyoaks (1996) – Mr. St. John Thomas
Time Trumpet (2006)

References

External links
 
 Aveleyman: Anthony Dawes
 British Comedy Guide: Anthony Dawes

1928 births
2021 deaths
20th-century English male actors
21st-century English male actors
English male television actors
Male actors from Suffolk
People from Felixstowe